Yang Bin may refer to:

 Yang Bin (楊邠), Later Han chancellor
 Yang Bin (businessman) (楊斌), modern Dutch-Chinese businessman
 Yang Bin (wrestler), modern wrestler
 Yang Bin (footballer), born 1991